Balmazújváros   is a town in Hajdú-Bihar county, in the Northern Great Plain region of eastern Hungary.

Geography

Twin towns – sister cities

Balmazújváros is twinned with:
 Łańcut, Poland (2002)
 Valea lui Mihai (Érmihályfalva), Romania (2008)
 Gulbene, Latvia (2012)
 Tiachiv (Técső), Ukraine (2015)

Government

Demographics

References

Populated places in Hajdú-Bihar County